Bobs Cogill Haworth  (1900–1988) was a South African-born Canadian painter and potter. She practiced mainly in Toronto, living and working with her husband, painter and teacher Peter Haworth. She was a member of the Canadian Group of Painters with Yvonne McKague Housser, Isabel McLaughlin and members of the Group of Seven.

Biography

Education and training
Bobs Zema Vera Cogill, later married to Peter Haworth, was born in Queenston, South Africa. She studied at the School of Design of the Royal College of Art in London, England with Professor William Rothenstein, Dora Billington, and Eric Gill, specializing in ceramics (1919-1923). She immigrated to Toronto, Ontario, Canada in 1923.

Private life
The Haworths lived in the fashionable upscale district of Rosedale in Toronto. Their residence was a mecca for artists holding formal meetings and small exhibitions.

Career and official commissions
From 1913 to 1968 she worked as a painter in watercolour, oils, and later in acrylic. She also used standard clay for her pottery works. The majority of her works are signed "B. Cogill Haworth" or "Bobs Cogill Haworth".
Haworth preferred landscape themes and waterscape themes but also ventured practice in non-objective paintings, some on a very large scale. Most of her paintings post-1950 were created on masonite and often signed on the front and verso; often with an artist's paper label.

In 1936, Bobs Haworth was one of the founding members of the Canadian Guild of Potters along with Nunzia D'Angel and Robert Montgomery.
Haworth was the first honorary president.

Both Peter and Bobs Haworth made illustrations for Kingdom of the Saguenay (1936) by Marius Barbeau.
The Haworths also collaborated on illustrating James Edward Le Rossignol's The Habitant Merchant (1939).

She was elected a full member of the Royal Canadian Academy of Arts in 1963.

Exhibitions
Haworth was a regular and prolific exhibitor with such institutions as the Royal Canadian Academy of Arts (RCA), Ontario Society of Artists (OSA), Canadian Society of Painters in Water Colour (CSPWC), Canadian Group of Painters (CGP) among other formal and informal art groups and organizations.

Death and legacy
Haworth died peacefully at her home in Toronto. At her bequest, she left her entire art archives and remainder of her art works to Queen's University. In 1998, she was one of the four artists in 4 Women Who Painted in the 1930s and 1940s, curated by Alicia Boutilier for the Carleton University Art Gallery, Ottawa.

Notes

References

Bibliography

External links
images of Haworth's work on MutualArt

1900 births
1988 deaths
Canadian potters
Canadian women painters
Canadian women ceramists
South African emigrants to Canada
Members of the Royal Canadian Academy of Arts
20th-century South African painters
20th-century Canadian women artists
Women potters
20th-century ceramists
South African women ceramicists
South African women painters